The 2009–10 season was the 77th season of competitive professional football in France.

The season began on 7 August 2009 for the Championnat National and Ligue 2 and on 8 August for Ligue 1 and the Championnat de France amateur. The season concluded on 14 May 2010 for Ligue 2, 15 May for Ligue 1, and 21 May for the Championnat National and the Championnat de France amateur.

News

Supercup in Canada
On 12 May, it was announced that the 2009 Trophée des Champions will be played, for the first time, on international soil at Olympic Stadium in Montreal, Canada. The match will contest the winners of the 2008–09 Coupe de France, Guingamp, and the 2008–09 Ligue 1 champions, Bordeaux, with the objective being to promote French professional football abroad.

Match ball sponsorship
On 5 June, it was announced that German sportswear company Puma will become the official provider of match balls for the upcoming season after agreeing to a long term partnership with the Ligue de Football Professionnel (LFP).

Presidential departures
On 17 June, Marseille announced that they were parting ways with longtime chairman Pape Diouf. Diouf had been chairman of the club for five years and was the only black chairman ever to preside over a Ligue 1 club. Jean-Claude Dassier was announced as his replacement.

On 7 July, Auxerre announced that Alain Dujon will become the club's new president. He replaces Jean-Claude Hamel, who had presided over the club for over 46 years.

On 10 September, Paris Saint-Germain announced that president Sébastien Bazin would step down from his role in order to supervise the club's surveillance council. He was replaced by Robin Leproux.

Television deal
On 29 June, the LFP board of directors announced that France Télévisions will be the official provider of Coupe de la Ligue coverage for the next three seasons.

French football records
On 9 August 2009, Bordeaux established a record for most consecutive league wins with 12, surpassing Lille, who won 11 consecutive matches in 1949, winning their last four games of the 1948–49 season and their first seven in the 1949–50 season. Bordeaux's streak began during the 2008–09 Ligue 1 season on 14 March 2009 following a 2–1 victory over Nice. The club broke the record on the opening match day of this season defeating Lens 4–1. The record lasted for 14 matches before coming to an end on 30 August following the club's 0–0 draw with Marseille.

On 31 October 2009, Grenoble set a record for most consecutive losses in French football following the club's 11th-straight league defeat, an 0–2 loss to Lille. The previous record of ten-straight defeats, held by Sète, had been intact since 1947. The losing streak came to an end the following week, on 7 November, following the club's 0–0 draw with Monaco.

DNCG rulings
On 23 June, the Direction Nationale du Contrôle de Gestion (DNC) ruled that Arles-Avignon would not be allowed to play in Ligue 2 following their promotion from the Championnat National, due to irregularities in the club's management. On 3 July, following an appeal, the DNCG reversed its decision, reinstating Arles' Ligue 2 status.

Following the DNCG's annual report on clubs, on 25 June it was announced that six clubs had been relegated from the National to lower divisions: AS Beauvais, SO Cassis Carnoux, CS Louhans-Cuiseaux, and FC Libourne Saint-Seurin were relegated to the Championnat de France Amateurs. Meanwhile, Besançon RC, US Luzenac, and FC Rouen, who were all recently promoted, were relegated to Championnat de France Amateurs 2, while Sète and Calais RUFC were relegated to the Division d'Honneur. All clubs relegated were allowed to appeal the decision.

Following an appeal from the aforementioned clubs, Rouen, Beauvais and Luzenac had their appeals successfully overturned, meaning they will remain in the Championnat National. Some clubs were, however, unsuccessful. For example, Sète's appeal was upheld relegating them to the Division d'Honneur; Stade Plabennecois will replace them in the Championnat National. Libourne Saint-Seurin, Besançon and Calais' appeals were also rejected by the DNCG, though all three clubs have decided to take their case to the CNOSF, the National Sporting Committee of France which governs sport in France. Both Calais and Besançon's rulings were determined on 23 July. The CNOSF determined that Besançon should be relegated to the CFA and not CFA 2, while Calais should respect and oblige the DNCG's ruling relegated them to CFA 2.

Libourne's ruling was determined on 27 July, when the CNOSF informed the club that they should honor the DNCG's ruling and suffer relegation to the CFA. Libourne's chairman Bernard Layda responded by announcing the club will file for bankruptcy, restructure the club and oblige the ruling. Besançon and Libournce are slated to be replaced by ES Fréjus and AS Moulins.

Both Louhans-Cuiseaux and Cassis Carnoux had their appeals heard by the DNCG on 9 July. On 10 July, the DNGC ruled that both Louhans-Cuiseaux and Cassis-Carnoux rulings had been overturned, meaning they will play in the Championnat National this season.

On 6 August, just three days before the start of the season, the CNSOF ruled that CFA 2 club Olympique Saumur would be allowed promotion to the CFA on the assumption that the club was ranked second behind Les Herbiers VF in terms of the promotion chart following a current CFA club's relegation by means of a federation ruling. With Besançon's relegation to the CFA, it has been determined that two groups will have an allocation of 20 clubs, while one group will have an allocation of 19 clubs. Due to the sudden circumstances, on 7 August the France Football Federation (FFF) devised a brand new schedule for the CFA. The FFF also announced that they had rejected the CNOSF's proposal for integrating Saumur into the CFA. Saumur responding by announcing their intent to appeal the judgment in Administrative Court.

Turmoil at 2010 FIFA World Cup
On 19 June 2010, France international striker Nicolas Anelka was dismissed from the national team at the 2010 FIFA World Cup after reportedly having a dispute, in which obscenities were passed with team manager Raymond Domenech during the team's 2–0 loss against Mexico. The FFF condemned the actions and, following a meeting with Anelka, Domenech and team captain Patrice Evra, the FFF agreed to send the player home. The following day, Evra engaged in a heated confrontation with team trainer Robert Duverne, with Duverne having to be restrained by Domenech. The resulting confrontation led to the players returning to the team bus and canceling practice. The team's managing director, Jean-Louis Valentin, announced his resignation from his position and the FFF the same day, stating he was "sickened and disgusted" by the actions of the team. The team, through Domenech, later released a statement criticizing the FFF for sending Anelka home based on reports from the media. The FFF responded to the statement by declaring the player's boycott "unacceptable" and apologizing to the world for the conduct of the players. The FFF also announced that following the World Cup, the Federal Council would convene to discuss the current state of the team.

Five players were identified as having been key to the embarrassing events at the World Cup – Nicolas Anelka, Patrice Evra, Franck Ribéry, Jérémy Toulalan and Eric Abidal – and all were summoned to a hearing before the FFF disciplinary committee on 17 August 2010. After the expulsion of Anelka and ensuing training strike, Evra and Ribéry were summoned for failing in their duties as captain and vice-captain respectively; Toulalan was seen as the originator of the statement read out by coach Domenech to the media; while Abidal was accused of refusing to play in the final group match. After the hearing, Anelka was banned from playing for France for 18 games, Evra was banned for five, Ribéry for three and Toulalan for one, while Abidal was not punished. Anelka dismissed the sanction as irrelevant, considering himself already retired from international football.

Promotion and relegation
Teams promoted to 2009–10 Ligue 1
 Champions: Lens
 Runners-up: Montpellier
 3rd Place: Boulogne

Teams relegated from 2008–09 Ligue 1
 18th Place: Caen
 19th Place: Nantes
 20th Place: Le Havre

Teams promoted to 2009–10 Ligue 2
 Champions: Istres
 Runners-up: Laval
 3rd Place: Arles-Avignon

Teams relegated from 2008–09 Ligue 2
 18th Place: Amiens
 19th Place: Reims
 20th Place: Troyes

Teams promoted to 2009–10 Championnat National
 Champions, Groupe A: Besançon 
 Champions, Groupe B: Hyères
 Champions, Groupe C: Luzenac
 Champions, Groupe D: Rouen
 2nd Place, Groupe D: Plabennec

Teams relegated from Championnat National 2008–09
 17th Place: Niort
 18th Place: Calais
 19th Place: Cherbourg
 20th Place: L'Entente

Teams promoted to 2009–10 Championnat de France Amateur

Promoted from CFA 2
 Champions, Groupe A: Marck
 Champions, Groupe B: Drancy
 Champions, Groupe C: Épinal
 Champions, Groupe D: Grenoble B
 2nd Place, Groupe E: Le Pontet1
 Champions, Groupe F: Toulouse Fontaines
 2nd Place, Groupe G: Les Herbiers2
 Champions, Groupe H: Carquefou
 2nd Place, Groupe B : Ivry-sur-Seine 
 2nd Place, Groupe C : Amnéville
 2nd Place, Groupe D : Bourg-Peronnas
 2nd Place, Groupe H : Avranches

1Saint-Raphael finished as Champions, but won't participate in next season's CFA because the club will fuse with ES Fréjus to form a new club. As such, Le Pontet was allowed to take their promotion spot.

2Tours B finished as Champions, but won't participate in next season's CFA because the DNCG deemed the formation structure of the reserves inadequate. Les Herbiers were allowed to take their promotion spot.

Teams relegated from Championnat de France Amateurs 2008–09
 16th Place, Groupe A: Vesoul
 17th Place, Groupe A: Metz B
 18th Place, Groupe A: Sainte-Geneviève
 16th Place, Groupe B: Saint-Étienne B
 17th Place, Groupe B: Saint-Priest
 18th Place, Groupe B: AS Monaco B
 16th Place, Groupe C: Châtellerault
 17th Place, Groupe C: Bordelais
 18th Place, Groupe C: Bergerac
 16th Place, Groupe D: Red Star
 17th Place, Groupe D: Guingamp B
 18th Place, Groupe D: Vitré

Managerial changes

Ligue 1

In season

Ligue 2

In season

Championnat National

In season

Transfers

Notable transfers
Bordeaux completes the signing of midfielder Yoann Gourcuff after the player spent the entire 2008–09 season on loan from Italian club Milan. The transfer fee was priced at €15 million.

Defending Portuguese Liga champions Porto lose four players to three Ligue 1 title chasers, with Marseille signing midfielder Lucho González for €18 million, Lyon signing both striker Lisandro López for €24 million and defender Aly Cissokho for €15 million, and Toulouse signing Paulo Machado for a modest €3.5 million. Porto also lost veteran defender João Paulo to Le Mans for a fee of €1.5 million.

Guingamp striker Eduardo, who wrote his name into French football history by scoring both his team's goals in a 2–1 triumph in the Coupe de France final against Rennes, moves to recently promoted Lens for approximately €3 million.

Four French national team goalkeepers move clubs, with Cédric Carrasso joining Bordeaux for €8 million, Mickaël Landreau joining Lille from Paris Saint-Germain for €2 million, Yohann Pelé moving to Toulouse from Le Mans on a Bosman transfer, and Grégory Coupet makes his return Ligue 1 signing with PSG from La Liga side Atlético Madrid.

PSG sign two Ligue 1 stars for a total on €12 million, committing four years to both Turkish striker Mevlüt Erdinç and Lorient midfielder Christophe Jallet.

Nancy recruits three Bordeaux youngsters: Malian striker Cheick Diabaté, French defender Florian Marange and the Togolese midfielder Floyd Ayité. All join the club, with Diabaté and Ayité joining on loan for the entire season and Marange signing a one-year contract.

Saint-Étienne sign two Argentine internationals from the Primera División of Argentina. The first signing being striker Gonzalo Bergessio, formerly of San Lorenzo, for an undisclosed fee, and midfielder Augusto Fernández, who joins the club on loan for the entire season from River Plate.

Honours

National teams

France
2010 FIFA World Cup qualification

Friendly

2010 FIFA World Cup

Last updated: 28 March 2010Source: French Football Federation Les matches de l'équipe de France

France (women's)
2011 FIFA Women's World Cup qualification

Friendly

2011 FIFA Women's World Cup qualification

Friendly

2011 FIFA Women's World Cup qualification

Last updated: 28 March 2010Source: French Football Federation Women's Schedule

France U-21
Friendly

2011 UEFA European Under-21 Football Championship qualification

Friendly

2011 UEFA European Under-21 Football Championship qualification

Friendly

France U-20
 The France under-20 team competed in the quad-annual Mediterranean Games football tournament that was contested from 25 June to 5 July in Pescara, Italy. France finished in a respectable 4th place losing to Libya on penalties in the third place match. The U-20 team will also compete in the 2009 edition of the Francophone Games that will be held in Beirut, Lebanon to begin on 26 September.

Last updated: 30 March 2010Source: French Football Federation U-21 Schedule

France U-19
2009 Sendaï Cup

Friendly

Tournio de Limoges

Friendly

Unofficial Friendly

2010 UEFA European Under-19 Football Championship

Last updated: 28 March 2010Source: French Football Federation U-19 Schedule

France U-17
2010 UEFA European Under-17 Football Championship First Round qualification

2010 UEFA European Under-17 Football Championship Elite Round qualification

2010 UEFA European Under-17 Football Championship

Last updated: 27 March 2010Source: French Football Federation U-17 Schedule

See also
2009–10 season
Olympique Lyonnais Ligue 1
Paris Saint-Germain Ligue 1
Olympique Marseille Ligue 1
Rennes Ligue 1
Chamois Niortais CFA

References

 
Seasons in French football